Chełm Śląski is a village in Bieruń-Lędziny County, Silesian Voivodeship, in southern Poland. It is the seat of the gmina (administrative district) called Gmina Chełm Śląski.

The village has a population of 5,646.

One of the village's best known sons is the missionary scholar and priest, Father Andrzej Halemba.

References

Villages in Bieruń-Lędziny County